Methylpropylbenzene may refer to:
 1-Methylpropylbenzene
 (2-Methylpropyl)benzene